Cafrune is the fourth album by Argentine singer Jorge Cafrune, released in Argentina in 1962 on the H y R label. Two versions of the disc, an Argentinian and Uruguayan version, were released.

Track listing

Argentinian version
"Zamba de tus ojos"
"Chacarera de Gualiama"
"Payo Solá"
"Corazón alegre"
"Milonga del solitario"
"Zamba de los mineros"
"Zamba de otoño"
"Linda mi tierra Jujeña"
"Minero potosino"
"Vamos a la zafra"
"Mis changuitos así son"
"Noche y camino"

Uruguayan version
"Las golondrinas"
"Pato sirirí"
"Ki Chororo"
"Río de los pájaros"
"Tierra querida"
"Zamba de otoño"
"El silbidito"
"Linda mi tierra Jujeña"
"Mis changuitos así son"
"Minero potosino"
"Payo Solá"
"La añera"

References

1962 albums
Jorge Cafrune albums
Spanish-language albums